Sandra Keller (born 10 August 1973 in Königs Wusterhausen) is a German actress, particularly  known for her role as Tina Zimmermann, née Ullrich in the television series Gute Zeiten, schlechte Zeiten, which she played from 1992 to 1996. In April 1996, she was on the cover of the German edition of Playboy.

Biography 
Keller left school without completing a leaving certificate in order to act in the television series Gute Zeiten, schlechte Zeiten. After leaving the series in 1996, she has not had as much success as an actress. In 2005, she opened a boutique in Berlin.

Filmography 
 1992–1996: Gute Zeiten, schlechte Zeiten
 1997: Matadore
 1997: Frauenarzt Dr. Markus Merthin
 1998: Wolffs Revier
 1998: Polizeiruf 110
 1999: Der letzte Zeuge – Der Weg zur Hölle
 1999: Die Strandclique
 1999: Lexx – The Dark Zone
 2000: SOS Barracuda – Die Tränen der Kleopatra
 2000: Küstenwache
 2000: Heimliche Küsse – Verliebt in ein Sex-Symbol
 2000: Für alle Fälle Stefanie
 2001: Ein Fall für zwei
 2001: SOS Barracuda – Der Mädchenjäger
 2001: SOS Barracuda – Der Hai von Mallorca
 2001, 2002–2003: Marienhof
 2002: Berlin, Berlin
 2002: SOS Barracuda – Terror im Paradies
 2002: Inspektor Rolle: Top oder Flop
 2005: Sturm der Liebe
 2007-2008: Die Anrheiner
 2008: Anna und die Liebe

References

External links 
 

1973 births
Living people
People from Königs Wusterhausen
People from Bezirk Potsdam
German television actresses
German soap opera actresses
20th-century German women